The 1993 Patriot League baseball tournament was held on May 8 and 9, 1993 to determine the champion of the Patriot League for baseball for the 1993 NCAA Division I baseball season.  The event matched Fordham and Navy, respectively the winners of the North Division and the winners of the South Division at Houlihan Park, home field of the Fordham Rams in a best of three series.  This was the first postseason Patriot League baseball championship.  North Division Champion  won the first championship and earned the conference's automatic bid to the 1993 NCAA Division I baseball tournament.  Joe Shultz of Fordham was named Tournament Most Valuable Player.

Both participants also played in the Eastern College Athletic Conference baseball tournament, which followed NCAA Regionals.  Fordham would also win the 1993 ECAC baseball tournament, held in Waterbury, Connecticut.

Results

References

Tournament 
Patriot League Baseball Tournament
Patriot League baseball tournament
Patriot League baseball tournament